Cuba participated at the 2017 Summer Universiade, in Taipei, Taiwan with 2 competitors in 1 sport.

Competitors
The following table lists Croatia's delegation per sport and gender.

Medal summary

Athletics

References

Nations at the 2017 Summer Universiade
Summer Universiade